Subinphaa (1281–1293) was the third king of the Ahom kingdom.  

During Subinphaa's rule, the Ahoms divided themselves into the rulers and the ruled with the formal delineation of the Ahom nobility (Satgharia Ahoms) and the rest of the Ahoms identifying themselves with the rest of the population.  Literally the Ahom of the Seven Houses, the nobility consisted of three state clans called Gohain (the royal, Burhagohain and Borgohain) and four priestly clans called Mo (Deodhai, Bailung, Mohan and Siring).

Notes

References
 

Ahom kings
Ahom kingdom
13th-century Tai people
13th-century births
1290s deaths
Year of birth unknown
Year of death uncertain